Ziomara Esket Morrison Jara (born February 15, 1989) is a Chilean professional basketball player. In 2012, she became the first Chilean to play in the WNBA when she was a member of the San Antonio Stars.

Career
In February 2012, Morrison signed with the San Antonio Stars. She was released by the team in May 2013, after an injury to Becky Hammon forced the club to sign another player.

In January 2018, Morrison signed with Skallagrímur of the Úrvalsdeild kvenna ahead of its game in the semi-finals of the Icelandic Women's Basketball Cup. In the semi-finals, Skallagrímur lost to Njarðvík despite Morrison's 25 points and 15 rebounds.

References

External links
Profile at Feb.es
Profile at RegeneracomSports.com
Ziomara Morrison at WNBA.com
Úrvalsdeild kvenna profile at kki.is
Profile at Eurobasket.com

1989 births
Living people
Chilean people of Panamanian descent
Chilean women's basketball players
Chilean expatriate basketball people in the United States
San Antonio Stars players
Centers (basketball)
Úrvalsdeild kvenna basketball players
Chilean expatriate basketball people in Turkey
Chilean expatriate basketball people in Spain
Skallagrímur women's basketball players
Sportspeople from Santiago